The men's road race at the 1966 UCI Road World Championships was the 33rd edition of the event. The race took place on Sunday 28 August 1966 in Adenau, West Germany. The race was won by Rudi Altig of West Germany.

Final classification

References

Men's Road Race
UCI Road World Championships – Men's road race
1966 Super Prestige Pernod